TCDD MT5400 is a series of 20 diesel railcars operated by the Turkish State Railways. They were produced by Société Centrale de Chemins de Fer of France in 1954–55. Also delivered were 30 trailers numbered MR401 through MR430.

External links
 Trains on Turkey page on MT5400

Turkish State Railways railcars